The 2020 CAF Super Cup (officially the 2020 Total CAF Super Cup for sponsorship reasons) was the 28th CAF Super Cup, an annual football match in Africa organized by the Confederation of African Football (CAF), between the winners of the previous season's two CAF club competitions, the CAF Champions League and the CAF Confederation Cup.

The match was played between Espérance de Tunis from Tunisia, the 2018–19 CAF Champions League winners, and Zamalek from Egypt, the 2018–19 CAF Confederation Cup winners, at the Thani bin Jassim Stadium in Al Rayyan, Doha, Qatar on 14 February 2020.

This season was the first to be played according to the new calendar, as per the decision of the CAF Executive Committee on 20 July 2017. The match was initially scheduled on 16, 17 or 18 August 2019, but was postponed. The CAF announced on 21 November 2019 that the match would be played on 14 February 2020 in Doha, Qatar.

The match was played in Qatar for the second season in a row, after they signed a three-year agreement with the CAF the previous season. Zamalek announced in November 2019 that they would not play the match in Qatar due to the Qatar diplomatic crisis. However, the club's board voted in February 2020 to play in the match.

Zamalek won the match 3–1, winning their fourth CAF Super Cup title.

Teams

Venue

The match was played at Thani bin Jassim Stadium in Al Rayyan, Doha, Qatar. The stadium has a capacity of 21,175 and is the home venue of Qatar Stars League side Al Gharafa. It was one of the five venues that hosted the 2011 AFC Asian Cup in the country.

Format
The CAF Super Cup is played as a single match at a neutral venue, with the CAF Champions League winners designated as the "home" team for administrative purposes. If the score is tied at the end of regulation, extra time will not be played, and the penalty shoot-out will be used to determine the winner (CAF Champions League Regulations XXVII and CAF Confederation Cup Regulations XXV).

Background
The match was the fourth CAF Super Cup to feature an Egyptian and a Tunisian team, with all previous three matches ending in favor of the Egyptian side. Espérance de Tunis qualified to the match after their controversial win against Wydad Casablanca in the 2019 CAF Champions League Final, where they were declared champions after the second leg was abandoned. Zamalek earned a place in the match after defeating RS Berkane in the 2019 CAF Confederation Cup Final 5–3 on penalties after being tied 1–1 on aggregate.

This was the seventh meeting between both teams in African competition. All of their previous six encounters were in the Champions League, including the 1994 final which was won by Espérance de Tunis where they grabbed their only victory against Zamalek in the second leg. The rest of the meetings resulted in two wins for Zamalek, including an away win in 2005, and three draws between the two teams.

Pre-match
Nine days before the match, the 2019–20 CAF Champions League knockout stage draw was held at the Hilton Pyramids Golf in Cairo, Egypt and resulted in Zamalek being drawn against Espérance de Tunis; meaning that both teams would face each other three times in three weeks.

Prior to their league game against US Tataouine, Espérance de Tunis announced that defender Abdelkader Bedrane has suffered from a torn ligament and would be sidelined for at least three weeks, missing the CAF Super Cup as a result.

Zamalek captain Mahmoud Shikabala suffered from an injury during training with the club in January 2020 and was still in the recovery stage. He was included by Patrice Carteron in the club's traveling squad to Qatar, but did not appear in the starting eleven or on the bench.

Match

Officials
On 10 February 2020, CAF named South African referee Victor Gomes as the referee for the match. Gomes is considered one of Africa's finest referees and consistently appeared in all CAF major competitions since 2013. His compatriot Zakhele Siwela was chosen as one of the assistant referees, along with Mosotho official Souru Phatsoane, while Maguette N'Diaye of Senegal was chosen as the fourth official. Zambian referee Janny Sikazwe was named the video assistant referee and was assisted by Mustapha Ghorbal from Algeria and Gerson Emiliano dos Santos from Angola.

Details

See also
2019 CAF Champions League Final
2019 CAF Confederation Cup Final

References

External links
Total CAF Super Cup, CAFonline.com

2020
Super Cup
Espérance ST matches
Zamalek SC matches
2019–20 in Tunisian football
2019–20 in Egyptian football
International club association football competitions hosted by Qatar
February 2020 sports events in Asia